Abba of Acre (translit: Abba d'min Akko), was an amora from Acre who flourished at the end of the 3rd century.

He was greatly respected by Rabbi Abbahu and praised as an example of modesty.

References 

  It has the following bibliography:
 Bacher, Ag. Pal. Amor. iii.526.

Talmud rabbis of the Land of Israel
3rd-century rabbis
People from Acre, Israel
Year of birth unknown
Year of death unknown